Pisco Elqui is a Chilean village (pueblo) in the commune of Paihuano, Elqui Province, Coquimbo Region. It is located in the Elqui Valley, 107 km east from La Serena, at about 1,300 metres above sea level.

This is a very controversial place, since it is claimed by Peruvians that Chileans modified the name of the village only to take a stand on the alcoholic drink of pisco. The original name of the town was La Greda. It was later changed to La Unión. In February 1936, the Law Decree 5,798 changed its name to Pisco Elqui to reinforce Chile's claim to have rights over the drink.

External links
Chile's Elqui Valley at The Cultured Traveler

Populated places in Elqui Province